Alfred Herbert Harold Gilligan (29 June 1896 – 5 May 1978) was an English first-class cricketer who played for Sussex and England. Gilligan captained England on their four-Test tour of New Zealand in 1929–30, which England won 1–0.

Life and career
Harold Gilligan played regularly for Sussex from 1919 to 1930. A right-handed batsman of style but limited ability and an occasional change bowler, Gilligan set a record in 1923 that is unlikely to be equalled when, in batting 70 times during the season, he scored 1,186 runs at an average of 17.70 runs per innings: the average is the lowest by any cricketer who achieved 1,000 runs in a season. He had his most successful season in 1929, scoring 1161 runs at an average of 23.69, including his only first-class century, 143 against Derbyshire. His Wisden obituary described him as a "beautiful stylist" who typically got out to an impetuous stroke just when a substantial innings looked possible. He toured South Africa with S. B. Joel's XI in 1924–25, virtually an England second team, but was not successful and did not play in any of the five matches against South Africa. 

Gilligan's brother was Arthur Gilligan, who captained England in 1924–25, making them the first, and to date only, brothers to have captained England. Arthur was originally selected to be captain-manager of the tour of New Zealand, but illness prevented him from going, and the selectors asked Harold instead. The Test tour of New Zealand was played at the same time as an England Test tour to the West Indies, where England were captained by the Honourable Freddie Calthorpe. Harold frequently deputised as Sussex captain when Arthur was absent, and in 1930 he captained the team for the whole season. 

Both brothers attended Dulwich College, as did their brother Frank, who played for Essex. Harold's daughter, Virginia, married the England Test captain Peter May in 1959. They had four daughters.

References

External links

1896 births
1978 deaths
People from Denmark Hill
People educated at Dulwich College
England Test cricketers
England Test cricket captains
English cricketers
Sussex cricketers
Sussex cricket captains
Royal Air Force cricketers
Gentlemen cricketers
Marylebone Cricket Club cricketers
English cricketers of 1919 to 1945
North v South cricketers